Zagora (foaled March 13, 2007) is a retired French Thoroughbred racehorse with graded stakes wins on two continents and two countries. Defeating horses like G1 Gamely Stakes winner Marketing Mix, Breeders' Cup Juvenile Fillies Turf winner Tapitsfly, European champion The Fugue, American Oaks winner Lady of Shamrock, Matriarch Stakes winner Stormy Lucy, and Flower Bowl Invitational Stakes winner Nahrain.

Racing career

European career
Zagora had 9 starts in her home country of France, winning four times including victories in the Prix Vanteaux, and the Prix de Psyché.

2011: four-year-old season
For Zagora's 4-year-old season, she was imported to the United States. She made five starts and won once in the Grade I Diana Stakes. She also ran in the Jenny Wiley Stakes but did not run in the Breeders' Cup.

2012: five-year-old season
As a 5 year old Zagora won both the  Hillsborough Stakes, and the  Endeavour Stakes. After a 5th in the Jenny Wiley she won the Gallorette Handicap. She won the Breeders' Cup Filly & Mare Turf.

Career and earnings 
Her final career statistics were 22-10-5-3 and a total of $2,368,589 in earnings.

References

2007 racehorse births
Thoroughbred family 16-c
Racehorses bred in France
Racehorses trained in France
Racehorses trained in the United States
Breeders' Cup Filly & Mare Turf winners
Eclipse Award winners